Paul Futcher (25 September 1956 – 23 November 2016) was an English professional footballer who had a distinguished career as a defender in the English Football League, for England under 21s and as manager of several non-league clubs.

He is regarded as a club legend by Grimsby Town who signed him at the age of 35 when he was apparently past his best. He went on to be described as one of the club's greatest ever players. Prior to his time with Grimsby he had enjoyed lengthy spells with Luton Town, Oldham Athletic and Barnsley as well as playing for Chester, 
Manchester City, Derby County and Halifax Town. After leaving Grimsby in 1994 he played for Dundalk before moving into management.

Playing career
Futcher was the defensive half of twin brothers. His brother was centre-forward Ron.

Futcher began his career with hometown club Chester, who he made his debut for as a 16-year-old against Cambridge United in March 1973. This came just a fortnight after his older brother Graham had played his final game for the club and seven months before Ron made his debut for the Blues. Futcher quickly turned professional and had made 20 Football League appearances when Luton Town snapped him up for £100,000 in the summer of 1974. Ron joined him on the journey south, where Paul was to play more than 140 games and won ten England under 21 caps.

Futcher was the most expensive defender in England when he became Manchester City's record signing for £350,000 on 1 June 1978. He replaced club stalwart Tommy Booth in the side which failed to live up to expectations and as the major new signing he attracted criticism. Booth won his place back, and on 1 July 1979 Futcher left Maine Road for a fee of £150,000 and joined Second Division Oldham Athletic.

Futcher had twice been chosen for the England squad and each time a road accident had put paid to him fulfilling the invitation.

Futcher was signed by Grimsby Town from Halifax Town reserves, aged 34, by Alan Buckley for £10,000 as a short-term replacement for Andy Tillson. He went on to be a fans' favourite for five seasons, winning the Supporters Player of the Year twice in that time. Then his son Ben Futcher joined the club for their League Two play-off final season of 2005–06 before he left for Peterborough United.

During his time at Grimsby, Futcher was held in high esteem by the club's supporters. Following the arrival of Brian Laws as manager and a poor performance in a match against Oldham Athletic, he departed in 1994, but remains thought of as one of the club's best-ever players.

He later played for Dundalk where he played in UEFA Cup Qualifying Round against Malmo.

Management and coaching

Gresley Rovers
Futcher led Rovers to the Dr. Martens Premier Division championship in 1997; they were not promoted to the Conference because their ground failed to meet Conference standards. During this time, they regularly played against now EFL League One club, Burton Albion, often beating them.

Southport
The highlight of his two-and-a-half year stint with Southport was the club's FA Trophy final outing in 1998, where at 41; Futcher became the oldest player to appear in a competitive Wembley final.

The Sandgrounders narrowly lost to Cheltenham Town, and the remainder of the former Manchester City man's Haig Avenue tenure was blemished by successful relegation scraps.

Ashton United
Futcher was unable to save the Robins from relegation to the Northern Premier League. He subsequently failed to motivate the squad (using nearly 50 players in 10 months) and left in December 2005.

Personal life and death
Futcher's twin brother Ron played in the Football League as well as being a top scorer in the North American Soccer League; and their older brother Graham also played professionally at Chester City. Paul's son Ben has extensive Football League experience. He is also the uncle of former Premier League midfielder Danny Murphy.

On 23 November 2016, Futcher died of cancer. Former club Grimsby Town described him as "one of the greatest footballers ever to have graced Blundell Park", adding that "It is impossible to describe the complete admiration we had for him, or the feeling inside as his wonderful abilities dominated matches. He was a complete one-off. Even though you had watched him come away with the ball in the most desperate of circumstances, you could never quite work out how he had done it!  He was nothing short of a genius!"

A minute's silence was observed at Grimsby's next fixture a 3–2 away defeat at Crawley Town. Whilst Grimsby also announced they would hold a minutes applause for him in their next home game against Portsmouth.

Honours

As player
Grimsby Town
 Third Division third place: 1990–91
 Grimsby Town Supporters Player of the Year: 1992, 1993

As player manager
Gresley Rovers
 Southern League Premier Division winner: 1996–97

Southport
 FA Trophy runner-up: 1997–98

References

External links

Gresley Rovers career details

1956 births
2016 deaths
Sportspeople from Chester
Chester City F.C. players
Luton Town F.C. players
Manchester City F.C. players
Oldham Athletic A.F.C. players
Derby County F.C. players
Barnsley F.C. players
Halifax Town A.F.C. players
Grimsby Town F.C. players
Dundalk F.C. players
Droylsden F.C. players
Gresley F.C. players
Southport F.C. players
England under-21 international footballers
English footballers
English football managers
League of Ireland players
Association football defenders
Darlington F.C. managers
Gresley F.C. managers
Southport F.C. managers
English Football League players
National League (English football) players
Stalybridge Celtic F.C. managers
Ashton United F.C. managers